Ei Ami Renu is an Indian Bengali drama film which is directed by Saumen Sur. It stars Sohini Sarkar, Gaurav Chakrabarty, Soham Chakraborty, Koushik Ganguly, Anindya Chatterjee, and Alivia Sarkar. The film is produced by Aangsh Movies.The music & lyrics for the film was composed by Rana Mazumder. The was released on 9 April 2021.

Cast 
 Sohini Sarkar as Renu
Gaurav Chakrabarty as Sumit
Soham Chakraborty as Baren
Koushik Ganguly as BBC, Sneaky Detective
Anindya Chatterjee as Ashok
Alivia Sarkar as Jhuma

Soundtrack 
All Lyrics Rana Mazumder & Music Rana Mazumder.

References

External links
 

Bengali-language Indian films
2021 films
2020s Bengali-language films
Indian drama films
2021 drama films